A national trade union center (or national center or central) is a federation or confederation of trade unions in a country. Nearly every country in the world has a national trade union center, and many have more than one. In some regions, such as the Nordic countries, different centers exist on a sectoral basis, for example, for blue collar workers and professionals.

Among the larger national centers in the world are the American Federation of Labor-Congress of Industrial Organizations and the Change to Win Federation in the USA; the Canadian Labour Congress; the Trades Union Congress (TUC) in Britain; the Irish Congress of Trade Unions; the Australian Council of Trade Unions (ACTU); the Congress of South African Trade Unions; the Dutch FNV; the Danish, Norwegian, and Swedish LO; the German DGB; the French CGT and CFDT; the Indian BMS, INTUC, AITUC and HMS; the Italian CISL, CGIL and UIL; the Spanish CCOO, CNT, CGT and USO; the Czech ČMKOS; the Japan Trade Union Confederation RENGO; the Argentinian CGT and CTA; the Brazilian CUT; the Armenian CTUA, and so on.

Many national trade union centers are now members of the International Trade Union Confederation, although some belong to the World Federation of Trade Unions.

See also

 List of federations of trade unions
 List of trade unions

References